Eremophila adenotricha, commonly known as glandular-haired eremophila, is a flowering plant in the figwort family, Scrophulariaceae and is endemic to a small area in the south-west of Western Australia. It is an erect shrub with sticky, aromatic leaves and pink, blue or purple flowers. It is a rarely seen shrub, apparently short-lived, mostly occurring in open, disturbed areas.

Description

The flowers are borne singly in leaf axils and lack a stalk. The tube is a shade of purple or mauve with purple spots inside the tube and the petal lobes are blunt. Flowering occurs in spring to early summer and is followed by fruit which are oval shaped and hairy near the top end.

Taxonomy and naming
The species was first formally described by George Bentham in 1870 as Pholidia adenotricha but in 1882, Ferdinand von Mueller changed the name to Eremophila adenotricha. The specific epithet (adenotricha) is from the Ancient Greek ἀδήν (adḗn) meaning "gland" and θρίξ (thríx) meaning "hair".

Distribution and habitat
This eremophila is only known from 3 locations in the Avon Wheatbelt biogeographic region. It appears to prefer disturbed areas with clay soils and to have a short life cycle.

Conservation status
Eremophila adenotricha is classified as "Priority One" by the Government of Western Australia Department of Parks and Wildlife, meaning that it is known from only one or a few locations which are potentially at risk.

Use in horticulture
Glandular-haired eremophila is a fast growing but relatively short-lived plant with unusual foliage and deep purple flowers. It can be grown from cuttings or grafted onto Myoporum and grows best in full sun, tolerates a wide range of soil conditions and is frost and drought hardy. Its compact habit obviates the need for pruning but its sticky foliage suggests it should not be grown in dusty places.

References

adenotricha
Eudicots of Western Australia
Plants described in 1870
Endemic flora of Western Australia
Taxa named by Ferdinand von Mueller
Taxa named by George Bentham